Night Fall is a 2004 novel by American author Nelson DeMille.

Plot

The story begins with the 1996 crash of TWA Flight 800 off Long Island, New York.  A couple conducting an illicit affair on the beach witness the crash and flee the scene, having accidentally videotaped the crash and what appears to be a missile rising from the ocean towards the plane.

Five years later, Anti-Terrorist Task Force (ATTF, a fictional FBI department based on the Joint Terrorism Task Force) detective John Corey is encouraged to reinvestigate the crash, officially blamed on mechanical failure, by his wife Kate Mayfield, who had worked on the original investigation.

The story is a sequel to The Lion's Game and reintroduces a number of characters from that novel. A sequel to Night Fall, titled Wild Fire, was released on November 6, 2006. One of the returning characters from "The Lion's Game" and "Plum Island" is CIA operative Ted Nash, whom DeMille has developed into Corey's antagonist and nemesis in his career with the ATTF.

Much of the action in the novel centers on the search for the couple who inadvertently videotaped the in-air explosion that brought down TWA Flight 800 off the coast of Long Island. At the center of Corey's investigation are witness statements claiming that the fatal explosion was caused by a missile and not by mechanical failure.

Corey is warned by his superiors not to look into the TWA crash, and he and his wife are temporarily assigned to anti-terrorist activities in Yemen and Tanzania to keep them from pursuing the case. They return to the U.S., however, in early September 2001, and Corey makes crucial discoveries which are quickly overshadowed by the tragic events of Sept. 11, 2001.

Night Fall debuted as number one on the New York Times Best Seller List on December 12, 2004, and remained on the list for 11 weeks.

References

External links
 Night Fall on Nelson DeMille's Official Website

2004 American novels
Novels by Nelson DeMille
Novels set in Long Island
TWA Flight 800